Alstonia costata, synonyms including Alstonia marquisensis, is a species of flowering plant in the family Apocynaceae, native to the Solomon Islands in Papuasia and to islands in the south Pacific. It was first described by Georg Forster in 1786 as Echites costatus. It grows as a shrub or tree.

Distribution
Alstonia costata is native to the Solomon Islands in Papuasia; the Cook Islands, the Marquesas Islands and the Society Islands in the south-central Pacific; and Fiji, New Caledonia, Samoa, the Santa Cruz Islands, Tonga, and Vanuatu in the south-western Pacific.

References

costata
Flora of the Cook Islands
Flora of Fiji
Flora of the Marquesas Islands
Flora of New Caledonia
Flora of Samoa
Flora of the Santa Cruz Islands
Flora of the Society Islands
Flora of the Solomon Islands (archipelago)
Flora of Tonga
Flora of Vanuatu
Plants described in 1786